Events in the year 1967 in Portugal.

Incumbents
President: Américo Tomás 
Prime Minister: António de Oliveira Salazar

Arts and entertainment
In 8 April, Portugal participated in the Eurovision Song Contest 1967, with Eduardo Nascimento and the song "O vento mudou".

Sport
In association football, for the first-tier league seasons, see 1966–67 Primeira Divisão and 1967–68 Primeira Divisão; for the Taça de Portugal seasons, see 1966–67 Taça de Portugal and 1967–68 Taça de Portugal. 
 9 July - Taça de Portugal Final

Natural disasters 
In 25 November, heavy rains lead to flash floods in the area of Lisbon, killing over 500 people.

References

 
Portugal
Years of the 20th century in Portugal
Portugal